Tomás Diez Acosta (born 1946) is a Cuban revolutionary soldier and a teacher and writer of history.

Tomás Diez Acosta joined Cuba's Revolutionary Armed Forces in 1961, when he was only 16 years old. From 1970 to 1986 he taught history at a Military Academy in Cuba, and has been head of the Department of Military History. He also holds a degree in political science. Diez retired from active military service in 1998 with the rank of lieutenant colonel.

Diez has written many books on the history of revolutionary Cuba, some of which have been translated to English, including October 1962: The 'Missile' Crisis As Seen From Cuba, published by Pathfinder Press, New York City, 2002.

Books

References

Cuban communists
Cuban soldiers
1946 births
Living people